Playdurizm is a 2020 film directed by Gem Deger. It had its world premiere in 2020 at the Lausanne Underground Film Festival.

Synopsis 
The film follows the story of a teenager who is trapped in a parallel reality with his favorite idol.

Cast 
Austin Chunn as Andrew
Gem Deger as Demir
Issy Stewart as Drew

Reception 
In his review for Screen Anarchy, Andrew Mack said the film is "it's certainly an unconventional feature film debut, written, directed and starring Deger. Officially it's been called in some places a neon-colored fantasy/romance/drama. Deger blends violence, romance, sex and wry moments of comedy into his compact tale. Small in concept and bold in color and style (...)  I am definitely curious to see what this young filmmaker comes up with next."

On CBR, Cass Clarke said that "Playdurizm unwinds its devasting mystery slowly with gleeful amounts of macabre plot twists and plenty of techno color confidence". On Scared Sheepless, Caitlyn Downs gave it a 4/5 rating saying that it is "fiercely original, even when homaging some of the horror genre’s biggest hitters, Playdurizm stands out as a unique, affecting experience that deserves to be seen."

Ticiano Osório of Brazilian newspaper GaúchaZH listed it as one of his favorite films from Fantaspoa pt 2021.

See also 
 List of LGBT-related films of 2020

References

External links 
 

2020 directorial debut films
2020s English-language films
Czech LGBT-related films
Czech romantic comedy-drama films
Czech romantic fantasy films
Czech horror films
Czech erotic drama films
2020 horror films
2020 drama films
2020 romance films
2020 fantasy films
2020 comedy films